UFC 93: Franklin vs. Henderson was a mixed martial arts event held by the Ultimate Fighting Championship (UFC) on January 17, 2009 at The O2, Dublin in Dublin, Ireland.

Background
The main event featured a Light Heavyweight bout between former UFC Middleweight Champion Rich Franklin and former Pride Middleweight Champion and Pride Welterweight Champion Dan Henderson. The winner of the fight would become the coach opposite Michael Bisping for the ninth season of The Ultimate Fighter: United States vs. United Kingdom.

The co-main event featured a Light Heavyweight rematch between Maurício Rua, the 2005 Pride Middleweight Grand Prix Champion, and the 2000 Pride Open-Weight Grand Prix Champion, UFC Hall of Famer, and former UFC Heavyweight Champion Mark Coleman. This fight was a rematch of their first controversial match at Pride 31 which resulted in a brawl between the camps of both Chute Boxe Academy and Team Hammer House.

Results

Bonus awards 
Fighters were awarded $40,000 bonuses.

Fights of the Night: Marcus Davis vs. Chris Lytle and Maurício Rua vs. Mark Coleman
Knockout of the Night: Dennis Siver
Submission of the Night: Alan Belcher

See also
 Ultimate Fighting Championship
 List of UFC champions
 List of UFC events
 2009 in UFC

References

2009 in Irish sport
2009 in mixed martial arts
Mixed martial arts in Ireland
Sports competitions in Dublin (city)
Ultimate Fighting Championship events
2000s in Dublin (city)
January 2009 sports events in Europe